Mikhail Evgenievich Masson (5 December 1897 in Saint Petersburg – 2 October 1986) was an important Soviet archaeologist. He was the founder of the archaeology school in Central Asia and a professor, doctor of historical and archaeological sciences and member of the Turkmen Academy of Sciences.

Early life and education 
Masson was the descendant of a French aristocrat who moved to Russia during the Jacobin terror. He studied at the Samarkand men's gymnasium. In 1916 Masson started studies at the Petrograd Polytechnical Institute to become an engineer and irrigator. However he was required to join the army and then returned to Samarkand in 1918.

Career 
Masson gained an interest in the protection and restoration of historical landmarks in Samarkand and soon became curator of the Samarkand Oblast Museum. He began conducting archaeological investigations and excursions and added to the museums' collection including panels of the Samanid palace excavated in Afrasiyab.

In 1924, Masson went to Tashkent and became head of the archaeological department of the Museum of Middle Asia. He was also further educated at the Turkistan Institute for the Oriental Studies and from 1929 to 1936 studied the history of mining at the Geological Committee. He led further expeditions including the Termez Archaeological Complex Expedition (1936–1938); the expedition for the archaeological supervision at the construction of the Great Fergana Channel (1936), STACE - South Turkmenistan Complex Archaeological Expedition (1946–1968), and KAE - Kesh Archaeological Expedition (from 1963). A former student was numismatist Elena Abramovna Davidovich.

Personal life 
Masson was married to the archaeologist Galina Pugachenkova.

References

External links
 UNESCO

1897 births
1986 deaths
Archaeologists from Saint Petersburg
People from Sankt-Peterburgsky Uyezd
Uzbekistani archaeologists
Soviet archaeologists
Uzbekistani scientists
Soviet scientists
People from Samarkand
People from Samarkand Oblast
Russian military personnel of World War I
People from the Russian Empire of French descent
Soviet people of French descent
Uzbekistani people of French descent